Balyuvitsa is a village in Berkovitsa Municipality, Montana Province, northern Bulgaria.

References

Villages in Montana Province